Olya is a rural locality (a selo) in Limansky District of Astrakhan Oblast, Russia, on the shore of one of the largest branches of the Volga River, Bakhtemir, near the Caspian Sea about  southwest of Astrakhan. It serves as a port on the Caspian Sea. In 2010 the settlement recorded 1372 farmsteads and 3752 residents. The port's cargo turnover was approximately 2.5 million tons as of 2006.

History
Olya is one of the oldest fishing villages in Astrakhan Oblast. The word Olya, which is of Kalmyk origin, means small hatchet describing the shape of the island on which Olya was originally located. Other villages are also on the islands, to the south and west, all separated by small channels. Chantais two kilometers south while Karantina is three kilometers southwest. Olya was originally between the coast and the mouth of the Bakhtimir, but the sea and the river receded and eventually the small channels separating the villages silted up. Olya and villages around it gradually merged with each other, forming a locality on maps designated as the village of Olya. Local names for different parts of the village include Forest for the southern part and Korya in the southwest. The name Olya refers to the northern part of town, directly adjacent to Bakhtemir.

The village has long been settled by  legal and illegal fishermen. The main village of fishing families live in this area, close to rivers. In the west, near the village of Olga Basta is a Kalmyk.

The first settlers were former prisoners Khans from Khiva and  Bukhara in Central Asia. They were descendants of  serfs  landlord Durenova in  Simbirsk, which were then in possession of a landowner, first Chubareva then Milashevoy. From the latter, they moved her to the closest relative, the rich Astrakhan fishermen Sapozhnikov and were brought to live in his castle estate on the lower Volga in the village: Harban  Zhitnaya Sedlistoe etc.

Before the revolution in the village, there were about 90 yards of buildings, many of which were made of wood. Ola hill (the fishermen call it more so) the front end of a promontory sticking out far in the pre-space. Often, strong wind from the sea skeletons flooded village. Since November 12, 1910, due to a hurricane with sea water has risen by 5 yards, 37 yards washed away, leaving only absolutely integral 8, killing all the equipment, property, livestock, there were casualties. Natural phenomena such residents were forced to move from its buildings back. Some transferred their home from one place up to 2-3 times.

In the summer of  1941, the village consisted of Olga few short streets, clinging to the right bank Bakhtemir. To the south of the village, with Eric Chantinka, lay a small Kalmyk Korya Haughton, consisting of two streets, and "violent settlement" (several households). Now both the village merged into one.

Old-timers - Galina and Michael Artemovich Konoplyuk remember:

Not far from the marina, three hundred meters upstream Bakhtemir, and was tehuchastok. They pestered boats, ships with cargo ship repair was performed. On tehuchastke they were loaded with fish, melons, vegetables. From the same soldier sent from Olga, and nearby villages.

The most severe was 1942 year. The aim of the Nazis was to capture  Astrakhan and take over access to the  Volga. They were eager to Astrakhan in the Kalmyk steppe. Olya village acquired strategic importance. Often with enemy aircraft dropped bombs along the Volga and the Ilmen Chad. The village was the most southern defensive lines at the output of the  Caspian Sea. For this reason, in the summer  1942, the building housed St. Nicholas Church headquarters unit anti-aircraft gunner, which consisted mainly of girls 18–22 years old. At the site of today's park were dug trenches and depressions, which were masked artillery. Of these, anti-aircraft gunner fired at the aircraft overflying enemy. After the defeat of the Germans at Stalingrad, anti-aircraft gunner sent to the front.

In early autumn,  1942, to the landing-stage moored barge with the soldiers, among whom were Olinsky. It was still quite warm, but the soldiers were dressed in overcoats, boots and armed with rifles. Without stopping, they headed towards the village of  gouge (now Lyman).

Exacerbate the situation in the desert gang who attacked convoys of civilians and poisoned water wells in the steppe.
Around November  1942, the barge arrived in the village of cavalry corps.

The main objective of all residents, not gone to the front, was supplying troops with food and clothing.
All the work was on the shoulders of women. In agriculture, employed over 700 people. Women worked at rybodobyche. Mastered the cultivation and rice, and cotton.

Physical features

Terrain
An important role in shaping the terrain has always played a  Caspian Sea, which level is constantly rising and falling. In prehistoric times the whole area was flooded and about 15 thousand years ago the sea receded. Settlement and its surroundings are located on the  plain aggradation below sea level, as most of the  Astrakhan Oblast. A notable feature of the plains are  Baer knolls.

Lakes of ilmenite located between the ridges of hills (Big Chad Little Chad Zaburunye, Big Rusnur, Small Rusnur, Gyunhara, Salty, Sazanov, Korsunkin, etc.). The largest settlement in the vicinity of Ilmen - Big Chad.

Soils
On the territory of the settlement is dominated by brown semidesert soils. For crops such soils should be further fertilize and irrigate. Also there are sandy soils.

Flora
In the distance from the water flora rather scanty and represented dwarf grasses:  Wormwood, thistle  couch  sedge, and prostrate summer cypress etc. There are also pockets of bush  zhidovilnika. Semi-aquatic vegetation is represented by  reed and chakanom forming impassable thickets. Many  Erik entirely covered with thickets zhidovilnika. Among the trees are numerous  willow and  elm.

Climate
Climate Olya  moderate continental, dry. The air temperature about 2-3 °C higher than in the  regional center. For the territory is characterized by constant wind. Spring (March, April) begins to blow south wind - the sea. Wind picks up a lot of sand and dust, sometimes creating poor visibility. Winds begin to subside with the first rains. In May–June has the greatest amount of precipitation in the form of torrential rains, sometimes with rain. In the second half of the summer starts  winds, which continues until the end of September. The hottest period from mid-summer to mid-September, is characterized by low rainfall. Fall is usually dry and warm. The first frosts occur in early November. Winters are mild. In view of the continental climate, the weather is uncertain: often severe frost thaws replaced.

Ecology
Sleeve  Volga Bakhtemir is the main supplier of drinking and irrigation water to Olga, and serves as a  migration through for  walk-through and semi-migratory fish. The main source of pollution is Bakhtemir port, as well as  freighters and river boats. In water contaminant heavy metals and petroleum products. The excess of the norm a small but growing concern is the capacity of the port, which will lead to a deterioration in water quality due to the receipt of pollutants.

For some soil characteristic leaching. Measurements have shown a slight excess of the highway from the norm. A large contribution to air pollution contributes a growing number of motor vehicles and rail transport.

Eric Chantinka flowing through the town, has a poor condition. Pollution by heavy metals exceeds 1.5 times the performance of Bakhtemir. Eric recorded in excess of normal pathogens. Most likely this is due to the uncontrolled release of waste directly into the  Erik. The dismal state of the territory of the settlement associated with natural dump household garbage. Therefore, it is important to the administration to carry out actions on the obstruction of landfills, and conversations with people, campaigning for maintaining the frequency of settlement and surrounding areas.

Port Olya
In the difficult period of ongoing global change in Russia - the geopolitical, social, economic, as well as in connection with the political situation created when Russia was left without a "sea gates" at the  Caspian Sea, there was a need for the merchant fleet and the creation of Flotilla base in the region. After the preliminary design study for the construction of the future port site was chosen near the village of Olga  Liman district in the  Volga-Caspian canal  Astrakhan Oblast. The project is implemented port Moscow Institute "Soyuzmorniiproekt."

Construction of the port began with the adoption of decrees of the President of Russia from 31.10.92, No. 1314 "On State Support for the revival of the Russian merchant fleet in the Caspian Sea," from 03.12.92, No. 1513 "On measures to revitalize the merchant fleet of Russia" program of revival of trade fleet of Russia in 1993–2000, approved by the Government of Russia from 08.10.93, No. 996.

June 3, 1997 was put into operation the first port with a capacity of cargo handling about 400 tons per year. In the second half of the 1990s to the docks from the highway, Olja Zaburunye Lyman was built access road of major types of length of 3 km. Roads in the "Outpost" is connected with the road P215 znacheniya. V nationwide January 2006, during the reorganization of the ownership of Federal State Unitary Enterprise "North Caspian Sea Shipping Company", the sale of port property and the procedures for bankruptcy was established Open Joint Stock Company "Sea Commercial Port of Olga." January 29, 2009, the EGM decided to rename the Open Joint Stock Company "Sea Commercial Port Olya" in the Open Joint Stock Company "First Stevedoring Company", which is the successor of Open Joint Stock Company "Sea Commercial Port of Olga" . The purpose of the Society is the restoration of stevedoring activities in the existing port facilities and the project of multifunctional sea port in the south, one of the new ports in Russia, involving both public and private capital. Stevedoring company - the company that owns a berth in the port, and it carries  Handling on this dock. In April 2006, the capacity of the port is 2.5 million tons. At the end of  2008, in a year-round has four berths with a depth of 5.0 meters at the pier, just the first of two planned commercial areas will be 13 berths. As a result of  2009, the company had profits amounting to 895 thousand rubles. Which is almost 36 times greater than in  2008 year. Part of the object is federally owned and administered by "Rosmorport". In addition to federal funds for construction of the port is enabled as a substantial part of private investment. Investor of private facilities in the port of Olya is CJSC "Commercial Sea port of Olya" (termed earlier - CJSC "Industrial investments"). The main developer of the port is OOO "Ola construction company."

The basic form of port - transhipment  general  shipping containers and the car ferry cargo. Advantageous geographical location creates conditions for the  cargo transshipments year-round, provides access to the river, sea, road and railways. After his year-round reloaded foreign trade goods of the following  Caspian Sea in Iran, Turkmenistan, Kazakhstan, the Indian ways. The port is open to international shipping, there are border checkpoints, and  Customs posts. Basically, all the berths are located frontally along the coastline. The construction of berthing front provided on both sides of the existing berths No. 1,2,3 shore at the site of the village of Olga to  Caspian Canal. Berths No. 4,5, including the backcourt, form a single complex - Terminal rolling cargo.  Hydraulic construction - berth number 5 - is included in the general scheme of construction and development of commercial sea port of Olya, which is funded from the  federal budget.

The development of international trade port Olya is a key project that can change the balance of traffic flows passing through the Caspian Sea region. Among the advantages of the port - maximum proximity to the Caspian Sea, the large free area for development; unlimited opportunities for growth in port capacity, the introduction of modern technologies of intensive processing of goods for the engineering and transportation.

Olya was designed and created as one of the projects that make up the trade relationship with the  Iran. During the  2009 year through the port handled 773 thousand tons of foreign cargo. In  import of Iran is dominated by fruits and nuts, as well as food processing  vegetables and  fruit. The structure of the Russian transport  export cargo through the port of Olya in recent years shows quite well-established range of goods:  metal,  sawn timber  Paper. In particular, one of the "running" of the Russian  export cargo -  grain - it will be possible transshipment in port after the introduction of the grain terminal, whose construction began in late April  2010 year. Starting capacity of this complex will be 500 thousand tons per year, with a consequent increase in the full development of up to 1 million tons. Simultaneous storage capacity up 36.6 thousand tons of construction completion scheduled for late  2010 year. Another  export cargo coming in  Iran -  vegetable oil. Under his handling at the port terminal under construction with capacity of 10-12 tons per month (berth number 6), its entry is also planned for the  2010 year. For dry cargoes, in particular,  iron, designed the first cargo seaport area, which is located on the shore Bakhtemir and immediately adjacent to the south to the village of Olga. At present, the port takes timber, oil, ferrous metals, grain, chemicals, automobiles, paper and other goods.

Development of the Russian port of  Astrakhan Oblast will create an effective element for the functioning of the international transport corridor "North-South" and change the balance of traffic flows passing through the region  Caspian Sea. It will facilitate the involvement of Russia and other countries in the process of world trade, as well as send some traffic from the  EU in  South Asia through the Central Asian and Middle Eastern states.

Olya port on the  Caspian Sea is promising for developing a port for all types of cargo with volumes of transshipment, as predicted by "Rosmorport" to  2020, at least 10 million tons. Gradually, he will take on a cargo handled at terminals in the  Astrakhan (about 3.5-5 million tons). Port area of 250-300 ha can count on such developments. While another nearby  Makhachkala port will be developed in collaboration with the port. At the same time, the Dagestani port will retain the transshipment of oil cargo. Planned  throughput for the liquid cargo in the port of Makhachkala reaches 15 million tons. Establishment of an expanded port. Infrastructure in the future will be one of the main advantages of the port of Olya, compared with the existing ports of the Caspian Sea. Currently existing port facilities of the Russian coast of the Caspian Sea is clearly not cope with growing freight traffic. The new port can be a good alternative for the construction of marine terminals in this area. In 2010, the turnover of Olga may have reached 1 million tonnes due to working with metals, and building materials. Further intensive development of offshore oil fields in the Caspian Sea, as the Russians and other countries will be an additional incentive for the development of regional port infrastructure. Planned opening of the inland waterways of Russia (mainly the southern half rings of Astrakhan, Olya to Rostov) can significantly enhance the role of the Russian Caspian Sea ports. Ports will be able to transit goods of other countries, in particular,  Kazakhstan, actively building a private fleet. With the commissioning of  berths and port infrastructure had placed high hopes on the socio-economic development of southern Russia,  Astrakhan Oblast and the entire transportation system. Prospective turnover after construction can take up to 30 million tons per year. This volume of goods subject to possible diversion of transit Europe - Iran, which is now done through the  Suez Canal.

Transportation

Intercity transport
Olya is associated with the regional center of a highway, which in turn is connected to Astrakhan federal highway Lyman Makhachkala. Passenger traffic carried by road in  Lyman and  Astrakhan. Flights from the bus made daily.

Rail

In  2001, the port Olya was included in the Federal Target Program "Modernization of Russian transport system." In  2004, the railroad was built by the railway branch length of 55 kilometers from the station to Yandyki port railway station "Port Olya", connecting the port with the Volga Railway. Through the station "Port Olya" carry freight.

The railway branch was constructed in the shortest possible time. In order to ensure the commissioning of the station and ferrying it was constructed simultaneously from both sides. Unloaded at the station Yandyki rail-shpalnye bars on heavy vehicles were taken to build power stations Olga. Transported to the same  puteukladchik went to the station Yandyki collecting  railway line.
Station port Olya, sludge and the way the way to go port berths were built at the same time. Administrative building of the station was equipped with the necessary means of communication with computers, office equipment, conditions for eating the station employees.

In July  2004, the opening ceremony of the railway line Yandyki - Port Olya. Less than a year approach station Olga received the status of the tariff. However, one can not ignore the problems of this branch is closely related to the development of the port. Port can not handle the unloading of the stated and arrived at his address of wagons, which greatly complicates the work of  Astrakhan site. Easy cars awaiting unloading on average 15 days (December 2007).

Ferry
In  2000, the regular open  ferry with the cities of  Turkmenbashi ( Turkmenistan) and  Anzali ( Iran). On  2005 year ferry service is available with the city Baku (Azerbaijan), Turkmenbashi (Turkmenistan), Aktau ( Kazakhstan ), Anzali (Iran).

City status
The concept of settlement carried out  Urban Institute (1993). The concept provides for the appropriation status of the settlement "the city of Olga." The positive trend of increasing  cargo and increase the area of port development create conditions to attract workers. First of all staff recruited from local residents. With the advent of large investments in port, there is hope for improvement of infrastructure (road repair, landscaping, small business development, social development, etc.). Employment and improvement of living conditions will significantly increase the growth of the local population.

Preliminary number of village Olya (the future of the city) in the "Concept" was set at 13.0 thousand inhabitants. However, given the experience of similar structures (in Russia and abroad), is currently difficult to predict the intensity of development of settlements in the future, and in this project, tentatively, the population is taken in $20.0 thousand.
Planning, organization and conditions for the development of maritime ports in the region as well as areas for development of the city is. Currently, a General Plan for Human Settlements s. Lesnoe, s. Basta and s. Olya MO "Ola village council" in the future city of Olya.

As part of the project is aimed at the port waters of port facilities with a total length of  berths about 5 km, reservation areas for possible development in the area of industrial and commercial facilities and warehouses for transshipment and other goods.
In addition, they plan to strengthen the role of the district center ( village Lyman) and the strengthening of the reference frame formed settlements on the basis of organizational and business functions support centers settlement systems. The future will remain 24 rural settlements, due to a small sseleniya (p. Zaburunny) and three small towns, which will be part of the new city.

Alexander Zhilkin, in turn, encouraged the youth to acquire knowledge and to return to their village to develop it:

Notes

Sister cities
 Bandar-e Anzali, Iran

References

Rural localities in Limansky District
Port cities and towns of the Caspian Sea